Blues Walk is an album by jazz saxophonist Lou Donaldson.

It has been considered Donaldson's "undisputed masterpiece". The title track by Donaldson is not to be confused with Clifford Brown's 1954 composition "The Blues Walk".

Track listing 

 "Blues Walk" (Donaldson) 	6:44
 "Move" (Denzil Best)	5:54
 "The Masquerade Is Over" (Herb Magidson, Allie Wrubel) 	5:54
 "Play Ray" (Donaldson) 	5:32
 "Autumn Nocturne" (Josef Myrow, Kim Gannon) 	4:55
 "Callin' All Cats" (Donaldson) 	5:15

Personnel 
 Lou Donaldson - alto saxophone
 Herman Foster - piano
 Peck Morrison - bass
 Dave Bailey - drums
 Ray Barretto - congas

Other credits 
 Cover Photo: Francis Wolff
 Recording by: Rudy Van Gelder
 Liner notes: Ira Gitler

Charts

References

External links 

 The Hard Bop Homepage

1958 albums
Lou Donaldson albums
Blue Note Records albums
Albums produced by Alfred Lion
Albums recorded at Van Gelder Studio